Larry Daniel Collins (born August 8, 1955) is a former American football running back.

Early life and high school
Collins was born and grew up in San Antonio, Texas. He attended Edison High School, where he played football and ran track. In football, he was a three-time All-City selection and rushed for over 1,000 yards in his junior and senior seasons. Collins was elected to the  San Antonio Independent School District Athletic Hall of Fame in 2019.

Collegiate career
Collins was a member of the Texas A&I (now Texas A&M–Kingsville) Javelinas for four seasons. His first carry as a freshman was a 79-yard touchdown run against Jacksonville State. He was twice named to the Associated Press's Little All-America team, was named first-team All-Lone Star Conference three times and the conference freshman of the year, and helped the Javelinas to three NAIA national championships. Collins finished his collegiate career with  4,511 total yards, then a record for a Texas college football player.

Professional career
Collins was selected in the third round of the 1978 NFL Draft by the Cleveland Browns. Collins didn't play in 1979 but was signed by the New Orleans Saints midway through the 1980 season. He was a member of the Boston Breakers of the United States Football League during the 1983 season.

References

External links
Texas A&M–Kingsville Javelinas bio

1955 births
Living people
Players of American football from San Antonio
American football running backs
Texas A&M–Kingsville Javelinas football players
Cleveland Browns players
New Orleans Saints players